The 1989 Eastern Michigan Hurons football team represented Eastern Michigan University in the 1989 NCAA Division I-A football season. In their seventh season under head coach Jim Harkema, the Hurons compiled a 7–3–1 record (6–2 against conference opponents), finished in second place in the Mid-American Conference, and outscored their opponents, 252 to 196. The team's statistical leaders included Tom Sullivan with 1,927 passing yards, Perry Foster with 1,087 rushing yards, and Todd Bell with 515 receiving yards.

Schedule

References

Eastern Michigan
Eastern Michigan Eagles football seasons
Eastern Michigan Hurons football